The Moldavian Plateau is a geographic area of the historical region of Moldavia, spanning nowadays the east and northeast of Romania, most of Moldova (except the south), and most of the Chernivtsi Oblast of Ukraine (where it is known as the Pokuttyan-Bessarabian Upland).

Limits

The Moldavian Plateau is bounded (in clockwise order), as follows.
 To the west by the Eastern Carpathian Mountains.
 To north and north-east by the Podolian Plateau.
 To the east and south east by Black Sea Lowland across which to the east stretches the Pontic Plain, part of the Eurasian Steppe and to the south towards the Black Sea the Bugeac Plain, comprising  in Moldova.
 To the south by the Romanian Plain (also known as the Wallachian Plain) and the Bărăgan Plain.
 To the southwest by the Vrancea Hills, part of the Sub Carpathians (also known as the Curvature Carpathians).

The Moldavian Plateau comprises over two-thirds of the territory of the medieval Principality of Moldavia, with the Eastern Carpathian Mountains and the Bugeac Plain representing the remaining part. This fact is the origin of the name of the plateau. This geographic area (including Eastern Carpathians and the Bugeac) is also called (especially by historians) the Carpathian-Dniester-Pontic region, or the Carpathian-Dniester region, since it is bounded by the Carpathians to the west, by the river Dniester to the north and east, and by the Black Sea (Pontus Euxinus) and the Danube to the south-east and south.

Genesis
The Moldavian Plateau was formed at the end of the Neogene through sediments, over an old continental platform, the East European Platform. Afterwards, the settled sediments, which were brought in by rivers from the Carpathian Mountains, were modeled by the elements giving the plateau its current aspect. The materials that formed the sediments are gravel and sand. Hardened, they formed gritstones. All over the plateau, the latter are interspersed with clays, or badlands, which produce landslides or other natural hazards.

The slope of the terrain follows the direction of the rivers: from northwest to southeast. The strata are disposed in North-South and northwest-southeast aligned layers, producing asymmetric valleys and ridges. Among the latter are the steep edge of the Bârlad Plateau, known as the Iași Ridge, the edge of the Central Moldavian Plateau, known as the Cornești Hills, and the edge of the Dniester Hills, known as the Dniester Ridge.

The relief  in the valleys of the rivers and creeks is quite conspicuous, so that the valleys have large terraces and hillocks. The Siret Passage, ramified in the north with the Moldova Valley, and Suceava Valley cuts the main part of the plateau from the Moldavian Subcarpathians. The Prut Passage cuts the Plateau in half in the north-south direction. The Dniester Passage bounds it from the Podolian Plateau and the Pontic Plain. Its ramification Răut Passage separates the main part of the Moldavian Plateau from the Dniester Hills

Composition
The Moldavian Plateau comprises several distinct regions:

 The Bukovinian Subcarpathians in the northwest.
 The Suceava Plateau, situated in the northwest, has altitudes that exceed  and long ridges.
 The Moldavian Plain, in the center-north has elevations of approximately :
 The Jijia Plain, west of the river Prut.
 The Middle Prut Valley, east of the river Prut, creeks tributary to the Prut, .
 The Bălți Steppe, east of the river Prut, creeks tributary to the Dniester, .
 The Bugeac Plain, the last continuation of the Pontic–Caspian steppe.

Climate
The climate of this plateau is transitional Temperate Continental.

The main influence on the climate is Dry Continental with frequent cold north winds in winter. In the Suceava Plateau and the Dniester Hills, there is an influence of Scandinavo-Baltic climate with the circulation of masses of polar air in the winter.

Waters
Streams on the plateau flow into the Siret, Prut, or Dneister rivers. The Prut has the Jijia as its principal tributary.  The Siret traverses and—with the exception of the Subcarpathians—limits the Moldavian Plateau 

The lack of precipitation has required water management  in the Jijia Plain and in the Bălți steppe which serves as a reservoir and for fish farming;  is the largest of these. Other bodies of water are  the rivers Siret and Prut (Lake Stânca-Costești),  in the Siret Passage.

Natural resources 
The Moldavian Plateau holds hydrocarbon resources (petroleum and the associated gases), which are extracted in the southwest portion.  In the northwest are found Romania's most important reserves of kaolin (china clay), extracted and used to produce porcelain. 

Hemp is cultivated in the Suceava plateau, cereals and wine grapes (Vitis vinifera) in the Jijia Plain, Bălți steppe, Bârlad Plateau and Central Moldavian Plateau. In the Siret Passage they cultivate potatoes and sugar beets.

Fauna
Characteristic of the plateau are mammals such as goats, wild boars, wolves, foxes, European wildcats, lynxes, badgers, and hares. Birds include black grouse, woodpeckers, cuckoos, pheasants, quails, hawks, owls, and fish include perch and the carp-like barbel.

References

External links

Plateaus of Romania
Plateaus of Moldova
Plateaus of Ukraine
Volhynian-Podolian Upland
Geography of Chernivtsi Oblast